Hellprint is a heavy metal festival held annually at Bandung in Indonesia. It is one of the biggest festival in South East Asia. The History Of Hellprint began in 2011. By 2012 the event had become one of the major music festival in Indonesia with 152 bands performing on 5 stages with almost 20.000 visitors. In 2015 Hellprint became the First Music Festival to hold a music festival tours in Indonesia

External links

Heavy metal festivals in Indonesia
Tourist attractions in Indonesia